Ruppin Academic Center, also known as Ruppin College, is a college in Israel, which has the status of an institutional settlement. It was established in 1949, is named after Arthur Ruppin, and is located near the moshav Kfar Monash, and within the Hefer Valley Regional Council area.

History 
It was originally called "Midreshet Ruppin" and the "Ruppert School", and was established to provide management education in the area of agriculture, the kibbutz, and the moshav. In 2001, it became a public school.

In 2013, Ruppin and Tel Aviv University created a joint multi-disciplinary center with the purpose of training students, with a focus on environmental issues in the Mediterranean Sea. In October 2014, it was announced that Noble Energy would establish a center to train technicians in the energy and natural gas industry at Ruppin with a grant of NIS 12 million.

It has four schools (economics and business administration, social and communal sciences, engineering, and marine sciences) and 15 academic departments, and awards bachelor's and master's degrees.

In 2021 Prof. Aviad Kleinberg was announced College president, replacing Professor Galia Sabar.

Research 
Research laboratories of Ruppin Academic Center:
 Knowledge Engineering and Robotics
 Cognition Lab
 Electro-Optics
 Judgement and Decision Making
 The study of personality and psychopathology
 Laboratory of loss and emotional pain
 Marine Science Laboratories
 The laboratory of materials and neuro-physiological nature and behavior of Cephalopoda

Marine College of Israel

History 
The School of Marine Sciences at the Ruppin Academic Center was founded in 1997 and originally known as the Marine College of Israel. It operated under the academic auspices of the Hebrew University of Jerusalem and its alumni received an undergraduate degree from Hebrew University until 2001. The college was established by Emek Hefer Regional Council Head Rani Idan, former vice president of the Technion, Professor Danny Wolf, Professor Micha Spira of Hebrew University and Daphna Pergament, who headed its administration until 2007. A nonprofit organization operated alongside the college to raise funds for it and guide it toward its goals. The organization's members were experts in various aspects of oceanography hailing from industry, academia, and the military.

In 2003, the college became the third school of the Ruppin Academic Center, joining what were then the School of Social Sciences and Management and the School of Engineering. At that point, its name changed to the School of Marine Sciences and it became an integral part of this public college approved by the Israeli Council for Higher Education (CHE). It receives subsidy through the council's Planning and Budgeting Committee (PBC). The School of Marine Sciences at the Ruppin Academic Center is the only institution in Israel that grants a BSc in marine sciences.

School of Marine Sciences at Mikhmoret 
The school offers two undergraduate programs with CHE accreditation, a BSc in Marine Sciences and Marine Environment and a BSc in Marine Biotechnology. The school also offers two graduate programs with CHE accreditation, an MSc in Marine Sciences and an MA in Marine Resource Management.

Notable alumni 
Or Sasson (born 1990), judoka

References

External links 
Ruppin Academic Center (English)
Ruppin Academic Center (Hebrew)
Knowledge Engineering and Robotics(Hebrew)
Knowledge Engineering and Robotics Lab (English)

Research institutes in Israel
Hefer Valley Regional Council
1949 establishments in Israel
Populated places in Central District (Israel)